People Tree can refer to:

People Tree Ltd., fair trade apparel company
People Tree, an artificial tree exhibited at Canadian Pavilion